The PLA Naval Aviation University is a military university located in Zhifu District of Yantai, Shandong, China. Its president is Wang Tianlin and Wang Jundong is the political commissar.

History
In 2017, during the 2015 People's Republic of China military reform, the PLA Naval Air Force Academy and the PLA Naval Aviation Engineering Academy merged to form the PLA Naval Aviation University.

Campus
Main campus: Zhifu District, Yantai, Shandong
Qingdao Campus: Licang District, Qingdao, Shandong

Notable alumni
 Wang Zhongcai, vice admiral in the People's Liberation Army Navy.

References

Military academies of China
Universities and colleges in Shandong
Educational institutions established in 2017
Air force academies
2017 establishments in China